Brousses-et-Villaret is a commune in the Aude department in southern France.

Population

See also
Communes of the Aude department

References

External links

Brousses.villaret.free.fr

Communes of Aude
Aude communes articles needing translation from French Wikipedia